Mujeres (English: Women) may refer to:

Isla Mujeres, an island in the Caribbean Sea
Isla Mujeres (municipality), one of the ten municipalities of the Mexican state of Quintana Roo
"Mujeres" (Fanny Lu song), 2013
"Mujeres" (Mozart La Para song), 2018
"Mujeres" (Ricardo Arjona song), 1992
"Mujeres", a 2008 song by Alexander Acha
"Mujeres", a 2020 song by Julieta Venegas
Mujeres, album by Coque Malla
Mujeres, album by Estrella Morente
Mujeres, album by Silvio Rodríguez

See also

Mujer (disambiguation)